Home Alone is a series of American Christmas family comedy films originally created by John Hughes, and directed by Chris Columbus (1–2), Raja Gosnell (3), Rod Daniel (4), Peter Hewitt (5), and Dan Mazer (6). The films revolve around the adventures surrounding children who find themselves alone during the holiday season and are faced with the challenge of defending their family's house or themselves from invading burglars and criminals.

The first three films were released theatrically by 20th Century Fox, while the following two made-for-television films were produced by Fox Television Studios, aired on the Disney-owned ABC. Following the acquisition of 21st Century Fox by Disney, a sixth film in the franchise was produced by the newly renamed 20th Century Studios for the Disney-owned streaming service Disney+. Also, an R-rated seventh film, intended to be directed by Augustine Frizzell, entered development hell.

Films

Home Alone (1990)

Home Alone is primarily a coming-of-age story about an 8-year-old boy named Kevin McCallister (Macaulay Culkin). He is the youngest of five children who is frequently bullied by his older brothers and sisters. After events transpire between him and his family, he wishes that he had no family when his mother is punishing him for what he feels are unjustified reasons. She warns him to be careful what he wishes for and he ignores it. He wakes up the next day to discover that he is the only one left in the house. He thinks his wish came true and that he is finally alone without his obnoxious family. In reality, he was left home by mistake. His family is en route to France for a holiday trip. While his parents realize their mistake and scramble to get back to the United States, Harry and Marv, a pair of thieves known as the "Wet Bandits", attempt to burglarize the house. Kevin makes it seem like the house is not empty and fills the house with a collection of homemade booby traps. Kevin manages to trap the bandits and they get arrested, just as his family return home. The film became the highest-grossing film of 1990, grossing $476,684,675 worldwide. The film received positive reviews from critics. It was popular with audiences. It was also nominated for two Academy Awards for Best Original Score for John Williams and Best Original Song for "Somewhere in My Memory", but lost to Dances with Wolves and Dick Tracy respectively. Macaulay Culkin's performance garnered him a Golden Globe Award nomination for Best Actor – Motion Picture Musical or Comedy, but lost to Gérard Depardieu for his performance in Green Card.

Home Alone 2: Lost in New York (1992)

Set one year after the events of the first film, Kevin McCallister loses track of his family at the airport to which he accidentally gets on a plane headed for New York City while the rest of the McCallisters fly to Florida. Now alone in one of the largest cities in the world, Kevin cons his way into a room at the Plaza Hotel and begins his usual antics, but when he discovers the burglars that he previously encountered, the Wet Bandits (renamed "Sticky Bandits") Harry Lyme and Marv Murchins who have escaped from prison and are on the loose again, he stops them from robbing the children's hospital charity from an elderly man's (Duncan's Toy Chest) toy store on Christmas Eve by setting up booby traps in his uncle's renovated house.

Home Alone 3 (1997)

Home Alone 3 does not center on Kevin or any of the original cast and characters, but still takes place in Chicago and instead on Alex Pruitt, a young boy who is left home alone with chickenpox, but soon recovers. At the same time, four international criminals are sent to steal a top-secret microchip that can act as a cloaking device for a missile. They succeed in stealing it and hide it in a remote controlled car, but due to a luggage mix-up at the airport with the Pruitts' neighbor Mrs. Hess, the car lands in the hands of Alex who is given the car for shoveling the snow in her driveway. The thieves begin systematically searching every house on his street. Once they realize that he has the chip, they prepare to invade his house. He devises elaborate traps and bamboozles the four crooks with the help of his pets and some intricate tripwires, all the while monitoring them with a video camera on the race car. The film was nominated for a Golden Raspberry Award for Worst Remake or Sequel, eventually losing the award to Speed 2: Cruise Control.

Home Alone 4 (2002)

The fourth installment was directed by Rod Daniel and premiered as a television film on ABC on November 3, 2002. This film returns to the original's main character, Kevin (played by Mike Weinberg), and one of the two Wet/Sticky Bandits, Marv (played by French Stewart). Kevin's parents have separated, and he lives with his mother. He decides to go spend Christmas with his father and his rich girlfriend Natalie, but finds himself having to deal with his old nemesis Marv, his new wife/sidekick Vera (played by Missi Pyle), and an unlikely servant of Natalie working as their inside person. It was released to Region 1 DVD on October 20, 2003. Filming began on July 29 in Melbourne. Home Alone 4 is the first film in the series that was not theatrically released.

Home Alone: The Holiday Heist (2012)

On March 15, 2012, ABC Family announced the development of the fifth installment in the Home Alone series. It premiered exclusively on ABC Family's Countdown to the 25 Days of Christmas on November 25, 2012. The film stars Christian Martyn, Jodelle Ferland, Malcolm McDowell, Debi Mazar, and Eddie Steeples. The story centers on the Baxter family's relocation from California to Maine, where Finn becomes convinced that his new house is haunted. When his parents become stranded across town, Finn sets traps to catch his new home's ghosts, but instead proves troublesome for a group of three thieves (McDowell, Mazar, and Steeples).

Home Sweet Home Alone (2021)

In August 2019, following the acquisition of 21st Century Fox by Disney, Disney CEO Bob Iger announced that a new film in the franchise, Home Sweet Home Alone, was in development, and would premiere on the company's streaming service, Disney+. By October of the same year, Dan Mazer had entered negotiations to direct the film, with a script co-written by Mikey Day and Streeter Seidell. Hutch Parker and Dan Wilson will serve as producers. The plot centered around a boy named Max, who faces off against a married couple after he allegedly steals something of theirs. Filming was reported to begin in the first quarter of 2020, with casting underway. In November, it was confirmed that the film would be shot in Montreal, Quebec, Canada, taking place from February to April. In December 2019, Archie Yates was cast as the lead, with Rob Delaney and Ellie Kemper set to play antagonists.

In March 2020, filming on all Disney projects, including Home Alone which had begun filming in Canada, were halted due to the COVID-19 pandemic and industry restrictions worldwide. In July 2020, Ally Maki, Kenan Thompson, Chris Parnell, Aisling Bea, Pete Holmes, Timothy Simons, and Mikey Day had joined the cast. By November 2020, filming on all the movies that had been postponed by the coronavirus had resumed filming, and in some cases completed principal photography.

The film stars Ellie Kemper, Rob Delaney, Archie Yates, Aisling Bea, Kenan Thompson, Tim Simons, Pete Holmes, Ally Maki, and Chris Parnell.

Future
By July 2018, Ryan Reynolds was attached to produce Stoned Alone, an R-rated Home Alone sequel film. Augustine Frizzell was hired to serve as director, with a script written by Kevin Burrows and Matt Mider based on the story concept by Fox Executive, Matt Reilly. The project was to be a joint-venture production under Reynolds' Fox-based Maximum Effort Productions, while George Dewey serving as an executive producer. The premise of the proposed project was stated as 'reminiscent of the hallowed comedy classic'. The plot centers on a weed-growing 'loser' (an adult Kevin McCallister) who misses his plane for a holiday skiing trip. He decides to get high, and as the paranoia side-effects set in, he believes he hears a break-in. As he discovers thieves have broken into his home, fully stoned and fueled by the weed, he tries to 'defend his castle'.

The next month on August 8, Frizzell said that the script for Stoned Alone was being tweaked in order to enhance the emotional Christmas side of the story, with the goal being to have the film feel as much like the original Home Alone films as possible; noting that as a fan of the films as well as of Chris Columbus, it was important to get the story right. She also stated that production will not begin, until everyone involved feels like they've reached that point. On August 27, following the acquisition of 21st Century Fox by Disney, Disney CEO Bob Iger announced that a new PG-rated family-friendly Home Alone film (later titled Home Sweet Home Alone) was in development for Disney+, with Stoned Alone entering development hell.

Cast and crew

Principal cast

Additional crew and production details

Reception

Box office performance

Critical and public response
For the first and second films, they received mixed and positive reviews by critics, while the third and sixth film received negative reviews by critics.

Music

Soundtracks

Other media

Novelizations
Home Alone was novelized by Todd Strasser and published by Scholastic in 1990 to coincide with the film. On October 6, 2015, to celebrate the 25th anniversary of the movie, an illustrated book by Kim Smith and Quirk Books was released.

Home Alone 2: Lost in New York was novelized by Todd Strasser and published by Scholastic in 1992 to coincide with the film. The "point" version, which have the same storyline, was also novelized by A.L. Singer. It has an ISBN of 0-590-45717-9. An audiobook version was also released read by Tim Curry (who played the concierge in the film).

A novelization based on the screenplay Home Alone 3 was written by Todd Strasser and published by Scholastic in 1997 to coincide with the film.

Video games
Home Alone was released in 1991 on the Super Nintendo Entertainment System, Sega Master System, Sega Genesis, Sega Game Gear, Amiga, MS-DOS, Nintendo Entertainment System, and Game Boy. The purpose of the game is to escape the Wet Bandits while bringing all the McCallister's fortunes from the house down to the safe room in the basement. Once all items have been sent down the chute to the basement Kevin must make it past rats, bats, and ghosts he encounters in the basement, then fight the spider king so he can make it to the safe room to lock away all his families riches.

Home Alone 2: Lost in New York was released on the Super NES, NES, and Game Boy in 1992, and the PC, Sega Genesis, and NES in 1993. Though it is based on the film in terms of plot and additional dialogue, the game was different from the film. The NES port uses sound effects from the early 1990s Simpsons games; Bart vs. the Space Mutants for example. The Super NES version, while boasting a soundtrack with the Super NES traditionally realistic sounding instrument synth, suffered due to slightly post-8-bit graphics and sound effects, as well as a disjointed feel of incontinuity between stages. The game got negative reception from Electronic Gaming Monthly.

Home Alone is an action game based on the first film and released in Europe only. The game was published by Blast! Entertainment Limited and released for the PlayStation 2 on December 1, 2006. The game features 10 levels, each taking place inside a house. The player chooses from one of four playable characters: Carl, Carly, Kelly or Kevin. The player's goal is to use objects to defeat burglars attempting to break into the house. The game includes a two-player option.

Other media
 In an advertisement short film titled Home Alone Again with the Google Assistant for the Google Assistant published on December 19, 2018, Macaulay Culkin reprised his Home Alone role as Kevin McCallister. The ad recreates scenes from the original 1990 film, where Kevin shaves his face, jumps on his parents bed, and decorates a Christmas tree all while asking the Google Assistant to set reminders for him. The advertisement quickly went viral. Ralph Foody, Joe Pesci, and Daniel Stern also appear in their Home Alone roles via archival footage.
 In the 2019 film Detective Pikachu, the lead character Tim Goodman (played by Justice Smith) enters his father's apartment and discovers the TV on with the movie Angels with Filthy Souls playing on it. Regarding its inclusion, director Rob Letterman stated, "Truth be told, we were just looking for the perfect placeholder...Mark Sanger, our editor, dropped it in, and it just fit perfectly."

See also

Related films
 Bushwhacked is a 1995 film starring Daniel Stern that was originally conceived as a spin-off film to the Home Alone franchise.

 Bone Alone is a 2013 film with the exact same plot, but starring a dog instead of a human.

Notes

References

 
20th Century Studios franchises
Comedy film franchises
Works about dysfunctional families
Home invasions in film
American film series
Film series introduced in 1990
Children's Christmas films